The year 1726 in music involved some significant events.

Events
May 5 – French dancer Marie de Camargo made her debut at the Paris Opera Ballet in Les Caractères de la Danse.
October 26 – Women are allowed to be employed at the Kungliga Hovkapellet in Sweden.
The Academy of Ancient Music (formerly the Academy of Vocal Music) is founded in London.
George Frideric Handel becomes a British subject.
Johann Sebastian Bach copies and performs 18 church cantatas written by his cousin, Johann Ludwig Bach.

Classical music
William Babell – 6 Concertos in 7 Parts, Op. 3
Johann Ludwig Bach – Ja, mir hast du Arbeit gemacht, JLB 5
Johann Sebastian Bach 
Meine Seufzer, meine Tränen, BWV 13
Es erhub sich ein Streit, BWV 19
Liebster Jesu, mein Verlangen, BWV 32
O ewiges Feuer, o Ursprung der Liebe, BWV 34a
Geist und Seele wird verwirret, BWV 35
Brich dem Hungrigen dein Brot, BWV 39
Gott fähret auf mit Jauchzen, BWV 43
Ich geh' und suche mit Verlangen, BWV 49
Falsche Welt, dir trau ich nicht, BWV 52
Siehe, ich will viel Fischer aussenden, BWV 88
Was Gott tut, das ist wohlgetan, BWV 98
Herr, deine Augen sehen nach dem Glauben, BWV 102
Gelobet sei der Herr, mein Gott, BWV 129
Vergnügte Ruh, beliebte Seelenlust, BWV 170
Ihr Tore zu Zion, BWV 193
Singet dem Herrn ein neues Lied, BWV 225
Fürchte dich nicht, ich bin bei dir, BWV 228
6 Partitas, BWV 825-830, Nos. 1 and 2
 Joseph Bodin de Boismortier 
 Trio Sonatas, Op. 12
 6 Sonatas for 2 Bassoons, Op. 14
 Antonio Caldara – Gioseffo che interpreta i sogni
François Couperin 
L'Apothéose de Corelli
Les Nations
Henri Desmarets – Adorate eum omnes angeli ejus
Andre Cardinal Destouches – Les Stratagèmes de l'amour (Ballet)
Francesco Geminiani – 12 Concerti Grossi after Corelli's Violin Sonatas
Benedetto Marcello – Estro poetico-armonico (expanded the 1724 version)
Nicola Porpora – Imeneo in Atene (Serenade)
Domenico Scarlatti - Fugue du chat
Giovanni Battista Somis – 12 Violin Sonatas, Op. 4
Antonio Vivaldi – La Sena festeggiante, RV 693
Jan Dismas Zelenka 
Missa Paschalis, ZWV 7
Missa Nativitatis Domini, ZWV 8
Nisi Dominus, ZWV 92

Opera
Francisco Antonio de Almeida – La Giuditta
Tomaso Albinoni – La Statira
Pietro Auletta – La Carlotta
Francesco Ciampi – Lucio Vero
François Francoeur and François Rebel – Pirame et Thisbé
George Frideric Handel 
Alessandro, HWV 21
Publio Cornelio Scipione, HWV 20
Johann Adolph Hasse – Astarto
Giovanni Battista Martini – Azione teatrale
Nicola Porpora – Meride e Selinunte
Domenico Sarro – Valdemaro
Georg Caspar Schürmann - Ludovicus Pius
Georg Philipp Telemann – Orpheus oder Die wunderbare Beständigkeit der Liebe, Premiered Mar. 9 in Hamburg
Leonardo Vinci  
Didone abbandonata
L'Ernelinda
Gismondo, re di Polonia
Siroe, re di Persia
Antonio Vivaldi 
Cunegonda
Dorilla in Tempe, RV 709
La fede tradita e vendicata, RV 712

Published popular music 
 "Sally in Our Alley" w.m. Henry Carey.  The music played today is an earlier traditional tune.

Theoretical publications 

 Jakob Adlung – Musica mechanica organoedi
 Jean-Philippe Rameau – Nouveau système de musique théorique

Births 
March – Joseph Anton Steffan, harpsichordist and composer (died 1797)
April 12 – Charles Burney, music historian (died 1814)
August 26 – Karl Kohaut, lutenist and composer (died 1784)
September 1 – Johann Becker, organist and composer (died 1803)
September 7 – François-André Danican Philidor, composer and chess player
December 24 – Johann Hartmann, composer (died 1793)

Deaths
January 2 – Domenico Zipoli, composer and Jesuit missionary (born 1688)
May 13 – Francesco Antonio Pistocchi, singer, composer and librettist (born 1659)
June 18 – Michel Richard Delalande, composer (born 1657)
July 8 – Antonio Maria Bononcini, cellist and composer (born 1677)

 
18th century in music
Music by year